Rosa Galyamovna Salikhova (born 24 September 1944) is a former volleyball player for the USSR.

She was a major player to help Soviet Union women's national volleyball team to dominate the World in late 1960s to early 1970s by winning 1968 Mexico City Olympic Games, 1970 FIVB Women's World Championship, 1972 Munich Olympic Games and 1973 FIVB Women's World Cup in row.

References

External links
 

1944 births
Possibly living people
People from Nizhny Tagil
Soviet women's volleyball players
Olympic volleyball players of the Soviet Union
Volleyball players at the 1968 Summer Olympics
Volleyball players at the 1972 Summer Olympics
Olympic gold medalists for the Soviet Union
Russian women's volleyball players
Olympic medalists in volleyball
Medalists at the 1972 Summer Olympics
Medalists at the 1968 Summer Olympics
Honoured Masters of Sport of the USSR
Sportspeople from Sverdlovsk Oblast